Samuel Yates (May 10, 1919 in Savannah, Georgia – April 22, 1991 in New Brunswick, New Jersey) was a computer engineer and mathematician who first described unique primes in the 1980s. In 1984 he began the list of "Largest Known Primes" (today The Prime Pages) and coined the name titanic prime for any prime with 1,000 or more decimal digits. He also called those who proved their primality "titans".  He is the author of Repunits and Repetends.

Samuel Yatrofsky married May Berkowitz on April 5, 1941, in Brooklyn, NY, and along with his wife, brother and brother's wife, changed their surname from Yatrofsky to Yates on June 25, 1943, in Burlington County, New Jersey, due to anti-Semitism. He is buried in Beth Israel Jewish Cemetery in Woodbridge, NJ.

External links
 

Number theorists
20th-century American mathematicians
1991 deaths
1919 births
Scientists from Georgia (U.S. state)